Media bias is the bias of journalists and news producers within the mass media in the selection of many events and stories that are reported and how they are covered. The term "media bias" implies a pervasive or widespread bias contravening of the standards of journalism, rather than the perspective of an individual journalist or article. The direction and degree of media bias in various countries is widely disputed.

Practical limitations to media neutrality include the inability of journalists to report all available stories and facts, and the requirement that selected facts be linked into a coherent narrative. Government influence, including overt and covert censorship, biases the media in some countries, for example China, North Korea, Syria and Myanmar. Politics and media bias may interact with each other; the media has the ability to influence politicians, and politicians may have the power to influence the media. This can change the distribution of power in society. Market forces may also cause bias. Examples include bias introduced by the ownership of media, including a concentration of media ownership, the subjective selection of staff, or the perceived preferences of an intended audience.

There are a number of national and international watchdog groups that report on bias of the media.

Types 
The most commonly discussed types of bias occur when the (allegedly partisan) media support or attack a particular political party, candidate, or ideology.

In 2000, D'Alessio and Allen studied three possible sources of media bias:
 Coverage bias when media choose to report only negative news about one party or ideology,
 Gatekeeping bias (also known as selectivity or selection bias), when stories are selected or deselected, sometimes on ideological grounds (see spike). It is sometimes also referred to as agenda bias, when the focus is on political actors and whether they are covered based on their preferred policy issues.
 Statement bias (also known as tonality bias or presentation bias), when media coverage is slanted towards or against particular actors or issues.
Based on the findings of Gentzkow, Shapiro, and Stone, they summarize two forms of media bias in the literature driven by different motivations: demand-driven bias and supply-driven bias. Demand-driven bias includes three factors: "reputation", "intrinsic utility from beliefs", and "delegation (or advice)".

Other common forms of political and non-political media bias include:
 Advertising bias, when stories are selected or slanted to please advertisers.
 Concision bias, a tendency to report views that can be summarized succinctly, crowding out more unconventional views that take time to explain.
 Content bias, differential treatment of the two parties in political conflicts, and to write biased news that benefits one side.
 Corporate bias, when stories are selected or slanted to please corporate owners of media.
 Decision-making bias, means that the motivation, frame of mind, or beliefs of the journalists will have an impact on their writing. And it is generally pejorative.
 Distortion bias, when the fact or reality is distorted or fabricated in the news.
 Mainstream bias, a tendency to report what everyone else is reporting, and to avoid stories that will offend anyone.
 Partisan bias, a tendency to report to serve particular political party leaning.
 Sensationalism, bias in favor of the exceptional over the ordinary, giving the impression that rare events, such as airplane crashes, are more common than common events, such as automobile crashes.
 Structural bias, when an actor or issue receives more or less favorable coverage as a result of newsworthiness and media routines, not as the result of ideological decisions (e.g. incumbency bonus).
 False balance, when an issue is presented as even-sided, despite disproportionate amounts of evidence.
 Undue weight, when a story is given much greater significance or portent than a neutral journalist or editor would give.
 Speculative content, when stories focus not on what has occurred, but primarily on what might occur, using words like "could," "might," or "what if," without labeling the article as analysis or opinion.
 False timeliness, implying that an event is a new event, and thus deriving notability, without addressing past events of the same kind.
 Ventriloquism, when experts or witnesses are quoted in a way that intentionally voices the author's own opinion.
 Demographic is also a common form of media bias, caused by factors such as gender, race, and social and economic status.
For example, in some European countries, female politicians receive fewer mentions in the media than male politicians, due to gender bias in the media.

Other forms of bias include reporting that favors or attacks a particular race, religion, gender, age, sexual orientation, ethnic group, or even person

History 
Political bias has been a feature of the mass media since its birth with the invention of the printing press. The expense of early printing equipment restricted media production to a limited number of people. Historians have found that publishers often served the interests of powerful social groups.

John Milton's pamphlet Areopagitica, a Speech for the Liberty of Unlicensed Printing, published in 1644, was one of the first publications advocating freedom of the press.

In the 19th century, journalists began to recognize the concept of unbiased reporting as an integral part of journalistic ethics. This coincided with the rise of journalism as a powerful social force. Even today, though, the most conscientiously objective journalists cannot avoid accusations of bias.

Like newspapers, the broadcast media (radio and television) have been used as a mechanism for propaganda from their earliest days, a tendency made more pronounced by the initial ownership of broadcast spectrum by national governments. Although a process of media deregulation has placed the majority of the western broadcast media in private hands, there still exists a strong government presence, or even monopoly, in the broadcast media of many countries across the globe. At the same time, the concentration of media ownership in private hands, and frequently amongst a comparatively small number of individuals, has also led to accusations of media bias.

There are many examples of accusations of bias being used as a political tool, sometimes resulting in government censorship.
 In the United States, in 1798, Congress passed the Alien and Sedition Acts, which prohibited newspapers from publishing "false, scandalous, or malicious writing" against the government, including any public opposition to any law or presidential act.  This act was in effect until 1801.
 During the American Civil War, President Abraham Lincoln accused newspapers in the border states of bias in favor of the Southern cause, and ordered many newspapers closed.
 Antisemitic politicians who favored the United States entering World War II on the Nazi side asserted that the international media were controlled by Jews, and that reports of German mistreatment of Jews were biased and without foundation.  Hollywood was accused of Jewish bias, and films such as Charlie Chaplin’s The Great Dictator were offered as alleged proof.
 In the US during the labor union movement and the civil rights movement, newspapers supporting liberal social reform were accused by conservative newspapers of communist bias.  Film and television media were accused of bias in favor of mixing of the races, and many television programs with racially mixed casts, such as I Spy and Star Trek, were not aired on Southern stations.
 During the war between the United States and North Vietnam, Vice President Spiro Agnew accused newspapers of anti-American bias, and in a famous speech delivered in San Diego in 1970, called anti-war protesters "the nattering nabobs of negativism."

Not all accusations of bias are political.  Science writer Martin Gardner has accused the entertainment media of anti-science bias.  He claims that television programs such as The X-Files promote superstition.  In contrast, the Competitive Enterprise Institute, which is funded by businesses, accuses the media of being biased in favor of science and against business interests, and of credulously reporting science that shows that greenhouse gasses cause global warming.

Confirmation bias 
A major problem in studies is confirmation bias. Research into studies of media bias in the United States shows that liberal experimenters tend to get results that say the media has a conservative bias, while conservative experimenters tend to get results that say the media has a liberal bias, and those who do not identify themselves as either liberal or conservative get results indicating little bias, or mixed bias.

The study "A Measure of Media Bias", by political scientist Timothy J. Groseclose of UCLA and economist Jeffrey D. Milyo of the University of Missouri-Columbia, purports to rank news organizations in terms of identifying with liberal or conservative values relative to each other. They used the Americans for Democratic Action (ADA) scores as a quantitative proxy for political leanings of the referential organizations. Thus their definition of "liberal" includes the RAND Corporation, a nonprofit research organization with strong ties to the Defense Department. Their work claims to detect a bias towards liberalism in the American media.

Supply-driven bias and demand-driven bias 
Supply-driven bias

A potential bias driver which represent that companies may "prefer consumers to take particular actions".

Implications of Supply-driven bias in the case of firm incentives:
 Supply-side incentives are able to control and affect consumers. Strong persuasive incentives can even be more powerful than profit motivation.
 Competition leads to decreased bias and hinders the impact of persuasive incentives. And it tends to make the results more responsive to consumer demand.
 Competition can improve consumer treatment, but it may affect the total surplus due to the ideological payoff of the owners.

An example of supply-driven bias is Zinman and Zitzewitz's study of snowfall reporting. Ski attractions tend to be biased in snowfall reporting, and they have higher snowfall than official forecasts report.

Demand-driven bias

A potential bias driver that is "demand from consumers themselves". Consumers tend to favor a biased media based on their preferences, which is also known as “confirmation news”.

There are three major factors that make this choice for consumers:
 Delegation, which takes a filtering approach to bias.
 Psychological utility, "consumers get direct utility from news whose bias matches their own prior beliefs."
 Reputation, consumers will make choices based on their prior beliefs and the reputation of the media companies.

Demand-side incentives are often not related to distortion. Competition can still affect the welfare and treatment of consumers, but it is not very effective in changing bias compared to the supply side.

In demand-driven bias, preferences and attitudes of readers can be monitored on social media, and mass media write news that caters to readers based on them. Mass media skew news driven by viewership and profits, leading to the media bias. And readers are also easily attracted to lurid news, although they may be biased and not true enough.

Dong, Ren, and Nickerson investigated Chinese stock-related news and weibos in 20132014 from Sina Weibo and Sina Finance (4.27 million pieces of news and 43.17 million weibos) and found that news that aligns with Weibo users' beliefs are more likely to attract readers. Also, the information in biased reports also influences the decision-making of the readers.

In Raymond and Taylor's test of weather forecast bias, they investigated weather reports of the New York Times during the games of the baseball team the Giants from 1890 to 1899. Their findings suggest that the New York Times produce biased weather forecast results depending on the region in which the Giants play. When they played at home in Manhattan, reports of sunny days predicting increased. From this study, Raymond and Taylor found that bias pattern in New York Times weather forecasts was consistent with demand-driven bias.

Time biased media and Space biased media 
Time Biased Media

Another type of bias in media is time biased media. The theory of Time Biased media comes from Harold Innis. Time biased media are hard to move and durable. Examples of time biased are stone, parchment, and clay. Due to the manner of being difficult to move time biased media don't encourage territorial expansion. Time biased media encourage and facilitate the development of heiarchy. They are kept for more traditional, sacred, and civilized societies. Time can be described as en entity where only the information in the environment is seen as important. Harold Innis believed that our societies today moved away from this media bias in order to allow for more democratic practices as opposed to monarch practices.

Space Biased Media

Space biased media is another type of bias that comes from Harold Innis. In contrast to time biased media, social biased media is light and portable (easy to move). An example of space biased media is paper. Space biased media allows for the expansion of empires over space, can be quickly transported, administrative, has a relatively short lifespan and allows for limitless opportunity. Harold Innis argues that space biased media has allowed society to create a more accessible world in everyday life.

Both time and space media biases demonstrate the way in which society communicate through sending information to one another. Space biased media is prevalent in today's society. These biases are crucial to understanding all the different intricacies of media bias.

United States political bias 

Media bias in the United States occurs when the media in the United States systematically emphasizes one particular point of view in a manner that contravenes the standards of professional journalism. Claims of media bias in the United States include claims of liberal bias, conservative bias, mainstream bias, corporate bias and activist/cause bias. To combat this, a variety of watchdog groups that attempt to find the facts behind both biased reporting and unfounded claims of bias have been founded. These include:
 Fairness and Accuracy in Reporting (FAIR), a progressive group, whose stated mission is to "work to invigorate the First Amendment by advocating for greater diversity in the press and by scrutinizing media practices that marginalize public interest, minority and dissenting viewpoints. As a progressive group, FAIR believes that structural reform is ultimately needed to break up the dominant media conglomerates, establish independent public broadcasting and promote strong non-profit sources of information."
 Media Research Center (MRC), a conservative group, with the stated mission of a "commitment to neutralizing leftist bias in the news media and popular culture."

Research about media bias is now a subject of systematic scholarship in a variety of disciplines.

Social media bias 
Yu-Ru and Wen-Ting's research looks into how liberals and conservatives conduct themselves on Twitter after three mass shooting events. Although they would both show negative emotions towards the incidents they differed in the narratives they were pushing. Both sides would often contrast in what the root cause was along with who are deemed the victims, heroes, and villain/s. There was also an decrease any conversation that was considered proactive.

Scholarly treatment in the United States and United Kingdom 

Media bias is studied at schools of journalism, university departments (including media studies, cultural studies, and peace studies) and by independent watchdog groups from various parts of the political spectrum. In the United States, many of these studies focus on issues of a conservative/liberal balance in the media. Other focuses include international differences in reporting, as well as bias in reporting of particular issues such as economic class or environmental interests. Currently, most of these analyses are performed manually, requiring exacting and time-consuming effort. However, an interdisciplinary literature review from 2019 found that automated methods, mostly from computer science and computational linguistics, are available or could with comparably low effort be adapted for the analysis of the various forms of media bias. Employing or adapting such techniques would help to further automate the analyses in the social sciences, such as content analysis and frame analysis.

Martin Harrison's TV News: Whose Bias? (1985) criticized the methodology of the Glasgow Media Group, arguing that the GMG identified bias selectively, via their own preconceptions about what phrases qualify as biased descriptions. For example, the GMG sees the word "idle" to describe striking workers as pejorative, despite the word being used by strikers themselves.

Herman and Chomsky (1988) proposed a propaganda model hypothesizing systematic biases of U.S. media from structural economic causes. They hypothesize media ownership by corporations, funding from advertising, the use of official sources, efforts to discredit independent media ("flak"), and "anti-communist" ideology as the filters that bias news in favor of U.S. corporate interests.

Many of the positions in the preceding study are supported by a 2002 study by Jim A. Kuypers: Press Bias and Politics: How the Media Frame Controversial Issues. In this study of 116 mainstream US papers, including The New York Times, the Washington Post, Los Angeles Times, and the San Francisco Chronicle, Kuypers found that the mainstream print press in America operate within a narrow range of liberal beliefs. Those who expressed points of view further to the left were generally ignored, whereas those who expressed moderate or conservative points of view were often actively denigrated or labeled as holding a minority point of view. In short, political leaders, regardless of party, speaking within the press-supported range of acceptable discourse receive positive press coverage. Politicians, again regardless of party, speaking outside of this range are likely to receive negative press or be ignored. Kuypers also found that the liberal points of view expressed in editorial and opinion pages were found in hard news coverage of the same issues. Although focusing primarily on the issues of race and homosexuality, Kuypers found that the press injected opinion into its news coverage of other issues such as welfare reform, environmental protection, and gun control; in all, cases favoring a liberal point of view.

Henry Silverman (2011) of Roosevelt University analyzed a sample of fifty news-oriented articles on the Middle East conflict published on the Reuters.com websites for the use of classic propaganda techniques, logical fallacies and violations of the Reuters Handbook of Journalism, a manual of guiding ethical principles for the company's journalists. Across the articles, over 1,100 occurrences of propaganda, fallacies and handbook violations in 41 categories were identified and classified. In the second part of the study, a group of thirty-three university students were surveyed, before and after reading the articles, to assess their attitudes and motivation to support one or the other belligerent parties in the Middle East conflict, i.e., the Palestinians/Arabs or the Israelis. The study found that on average, subject sentiment shifted significantly following the readings in favor of the Arabs and that this shift was associated with particular propaganda techniques and logical fallacies appearing in the stories. Silverman inferred from the evidence that Reuters engages in systematically biased storytelling in favor of the Arabs/Palestinians and is able to influence audience affective behavior and motivate direct action along the same trajectory.

Studies reporting perceptions of bias in the media are not limited to studies of print media. A joint study by the Joan Shorenstein Center on Press, Politics and Public Policy at Harvard University and the Project for Excellence in Journalism found that people see media bias in television news media such as CNN. Although both CNN and Fox were perceived in the study as not being centrist, CNN was perceived as being more liberal than Fox. Moreover, the study's findings concerning CNN's perceived bias are echoed in other studies. There is also a growing economics literature on mass media bias, both on the theoretical and the empirical side. On the theoretical side the focus is on understanding to what extent the political positioning of mass media outlets is mainly driven by demand or supply factors. This literature is surveyed by Andrea Prat of Columbia University and David Stromberg of Stockholm University.

According to Dan Sutter of the University of Oklahoma, a systematic liberal bias in the U.S. media could depend on the fact that owners and/or journalists typically lean to the left.

Along the same lines, David Baron of Stanford GSB presents a game-theoretic model of mass media behaviour in which, given that the pool of journalists systematically leans towards the left or the right, mass media outlets maximise their profits by providing content that is biased in the same direction. They can do so, because it is cheaper to hire journalists who write stories  that are consistent with their political position.  A concurrent theory would be that supply and demand would cause media to attain a neutral balance because consumers would of course gravitate towards the media they agreed with. This argument fails in considering the imbalance in self-reported political allegiances by journalists themselves, that distort any market analogy as regards offer: (..) Indeed, in 1982, 85 percent of Columbia Graduate School of Journalism students identified themselves as liberal, versus 11 percent conservative" (Lichter, Rothman, and Lichter 1986: 48), quoted in Sutter, 2001.

This same argument would have news outlets in equal numbers increasing profits of a more balanced media far more than the slight increase in costs to hire unbiased journalists, notwithstanding the extreme rarity of self-reported conservative journalists (Sutton, 2001).

As mentioned above, Tim Groseclose of UCLA and Jeff Milyo of the University of Missouri at Columbia use think tank quotes, in order to estimate the relative position of mass media outlets in the political spectrum. The idea is to trace out which think tanks are quoted by various mass media outlets within news stories, and to match these think tanks with the political position of members of the U.S. Congress who quote them in a non-negative way. Using this procedure, Groseclose and Milyo obtain the stark result that all sampled news providers – except Fox News' Special Report and the Washington Times – are located to the left of the average Congress member, i.e. there are signs of a liberal bias in the US news media.

The methods Groseclose and Milyo used to calculate this bias have been criticized by Mark Liberman, a professor of Linguistics at the University of Pennsylvania.  Liberman concludes by saying he thinks "that many if not most of the complaints directed against G&M are motivated in part by ideological disagreement – just as much of the praise for their work is motivated by ideological agreement. It would be nice if there were a less politically fraught body of data on which such modeling exercises could be explored."

Sendhil Mullainathan and Andrei Shleifer of Harvard University construct a behavioural model, which is built around the assumption that readers and viewers hold beliefs that they would like to see confirmed by news providers. When news customers share common beliefs, profit-maximizing media outlets find it optimal to select and/or frame stories in order to pander to those beliefs. On the other hand, when beliefs are heterogeneous, news providers differentiate their offer and segment the market, by providing news stories that are slanted towards the two extreme positions in the spectrum of beliefs.

Matthew Gentzkow and Jesse Shapiro of Chicago GSB present another demand-driven theory of mass media bias. If readers and viewers have a priori views on the current state of affairs and are uncertain about the quality of the information about it being provided by media outlets, then the latter have an incentive to slant stories towards their customers' prior beliefs, in order to build and keep a reputation for high-quality journalism. The reason for this is that rational agents would tend to believe that pieces of information that go against their prior beliefs in fact originate from low-quality news providers.

Given that different groups in society have different beliefs, priorities, and interests, to which group would the media tailor its bias? David Stromberg constructs a demand-driven model where media bias arises because different audiences have different effects on media profits. Advertisers pay more for affluent audiences and media may tailor content to attract this audience, perhaps producing a right-wing bias. On the other hand, urban audiences are more profitable to newspapers because of lower delivery costs. Newspapers may for this reason tailor their content to attract the profitable predominantly liberal urban audiences. Finally, because of the increasing returns to scale in news production, small groups such as minorities are less profitable. This biases media content against the interest of minorities.

Steve Ansolabehere, Rebecca Lessem and Jim Snyder of the Massachusetts Institute of Technology analyze the political orientation of endorsements by U.S. newspapers. They find an upward trend in the average propensity to endorse a candidate, and in particular an incumbent one. There are also some changes in the average ideological slant of endorsements: while in the 1940s and in the 1950s there was a clear advantage to Republican candidates, this advantage continuously eroded in subsequent decades, to the extent that in the 1990s the authors find a slight Democratic lead in the average endorsement choice.

John Lott and Kevin Hassett of the American Enterprise Institute study the coverage of economic news by looking at a panel of 389 U.S. newspapers from 1991 to 2004, and from 1985 to 2004 for a subsample comprising the top 10 newspapers and the Associated Press. For each release of official data about a set of economic indicators, the authors analyze how newspapers decide to report on them, as reflected by the tone of the related headlines. The idea is to check whether newspapers display some kind of partisan bias, by giving more positive or negative coverage to the same economic figure, as a function of the political affiliation of the incumbent president. Controlling for the economic data being released, the authors find that there are between 9.6 and 14.7 percent fewer positive stories when the incumbent president is a Republican.

Riccardo Puglisi of the Massachusetts Institute of Technology looks at the editorial choices of the New York Times from 1946 to 1997. He finds that the Times displays Democratic partisanship, with some watchdog aspects. This is the case, because during presidential campaigns the Times systematically gives more coverage to Democratic topics of civil rights, health care, labor and social welfare, but only when the incumbent president is a Republican. These topics are classified as Democratic ones, because Gallup polls show that on average U.S. citizens think that Democratic candidates would be better at handling problems related to them. According to Puglisi, in the post-1960 period the Times displays a more symmetric type of watchdog behaviour, just because during presidential campaigns it also gives more coverage to the typically Republican issue of defense when the incumbent president is a Democrat, and less so when the incumbent is a Republican.

Alan Gerber and Dean Karlan of Yale University use an experimental approach to examine not whether the media are biased, but whether the media influence political decisions and attitudes.  They conduct a randomized control trial just prior to the November 2005 gubernatorial election in Virginia and randomly assign individuals in Northern Virginia to (a) a treatment group that receives a free subscription to the Washington Post, (b) a treatment group that receives a free subscription to the Washington Times, or (c) a control group.  They find that those who are assigned to the Washington Post treatment group are eight percentage points more likely to vote for the Democrat in the elections. The report also found that "exposure to either newspaper was weakly linked to a movement away from the Bush administration and Republicans."

A self-described "progressive" media watchdog group, Fairness and Accuracy in Reporting (FAIR), in consultation with the Survey and Evaluation Research Laboratory at Virginia Commonwealth University, sponsored a 1998 survey in which 141 Washington bureau chiefs and Washington-based journalists were asked a range of questions about how they did their work and about how they viewed the quality of media coverage in the broad area of politics and economic policy. "They were asked for their opinions and views about a range of recent policy issues and debates. Finally, they were asked for demographic and identifying information, including their political orientation". They then compared to the same or similar questions posed with "the public" based on Gallup, and Pew Trust polls. Their study concluded that a majority of journalists, although relatively liberal on social policies, were significantly to the right of the public on economic, labor, health care and foreign policy issues.

This study continues: "we learn much more about the political orientation of news content by looking at sourcing patterns rather than journalists' personal views. As this survey shows, it is government officials and business representatives to whom journalists "nearly always" turn when covering economic policy. Labor representatives and consumer advocates were at the bottom of the list. This is consistent with earlier research on sources. For example, analysts from the non-partisan Brookings Institution and from conservative think tanks such as the Heritage Foundation and the American Enterprise Institute are those most quoted in mainstream news accounts.

In direct contrast to the FAIR survey, in 2014, media communication researcher Jim A. Kuypers published a 40-year longitudinal, aggregate study of the political beliefs and actions of American journalists.  In every single category, for instance, social, economic, unions, health care, and foreign policy, he found that nationwide, print and broadcast journalists and editors as a group were "considerably" to the political left of the majority of Americans, and that these political beliefs found their way into news stories.  Kuypers concluded, "Do the political proclivities of journalists influence their interpretation of the news?  I answer that with a resounding, yes.  As part of my evidence, I consider testimony from journalists themselves. ... [A] solid majority of journalists do allow their political ideology to influence their reporting."

Jonathan M. Ladd, who has conducted intensive studies of media trust and media bias, concluded that the primary cause of belief in media bias is media telling their audience that particular media are biased.  People who are told that a medium is biased tend to believe that it is biased, and this belief is unrelated to whether that medium is actually biased or not.  The only other factor with as strong an influence on belief that media is biased is extensive coverage of celebrities.  A majority of people see such media as biased, while at the same time preferring media with extensive coverage of celebrities.

Starting in 2017, the Knight Foundation and Gallup conducted research to try to understand the effect of reader bias on the reader's perception of news source bias. They created the NewsLens site to present news from a variety of sources without labeling where the article came from. Their research showed that those with more extreme political views tend to provide more biased ratings of news. NewsLens became generally available in 2020, with the goals of expanding on the research and helping the US public to read and share news with less bias. However, the platform was closed.

Efforts to correct bias 
A technique used to avoid bias is the "point/counterpoint" or "round table", an adversarial format in which representatives of opposing views comment on an issue. This approach theoretically allows diverse views to appear in the media. However, the person organizing the report still has the responsibility to choose reporters or journalists that represent a diverse or balanced set of opinions, to ask them non-prejudicial questions, and to edit or arbitrate their comments fairly. When done carelessly, a point/counterpoint can be as unfair as a simple biased report, by suggesting that the "losing" side lost on its merits. Besides these challenges, exposing news consumers to differing viewpoints seems to be beneficial for a balanced understanding and more critical assessment of current events and latent topics.

Using this format can also lead to accusations that the reporter has created a misleading appearance that viewpoints have equal validity (sometimes called "false balance"). This may happen when a taboo exists around one of the viewpoints, or when one of the representatives habitually makes claims that are easily shown to be inaccurate.

One such allegation of misleading balance came from Mark Halperin, political director of ABC News. He stated in an internal e-mail message that reporters should not "artificially hold George W. Bush and John Kerry 'equally' accountable" to the public interest, and that complaints from Bush supporters were an attempt to "get away with ... renewed efforts to win the election by destroying Senator Kerry." When the conservative web site the Drudge Report published this message,  many Bush supporters viewed it as "smoking gun" evidence that Halperin was using ABC to propagandize against Bush to Kerry's benefit, by interfering with reporters' attempts to avoid bias. An academic content analysis of election news later found that coverage at ABC, CBS, and NBC was more favorable toward Kerry than Bush, while coverage at Fox News Channel was more favorable toward Bush.

Scott Norvell, the London bureau chief for Fox News, stated in a May 20, 2005 interview with the Wall Street Journal that:
"Even we at Fox News manage to get some lefties on the air occasionally, and often let them finish their sentences before we club them to death and feed the scraps to Karl Rove and Bill O'Reilly. And those who hate us can take solace in the fact that they aren't subsidizing Bill's bombast; we payers of the BBC license fee don't enjoy that peace of mind.
Fox News is, after all, a private channel and our presenters are quite open about where they stand on particular stories. That's our appeal. People watch us because they know what they are getting. The Beeb's (British Broadcasting Corporation) (BBC) institutionalized leftism would be easier to tolerate if the corporation was a little more honest about it".

Another technique used to avoid bias is disclosure of affiliations that may be considered a possible conflict of interest.  This is especially apparent when a news organization is reporting a story with some relevancy to the news organization itself or to its ownership individuals or conglomerate.  Often this disclosure is mandated by the laws or regulations pertaining to stocks and securities.  Commentators on news stories involving stocks are often required to disclose any ownership interest in those corporations or in its competitors.

In rare cases, a news organization may dismiss or reassign staff members who appear biased. This approach was used in the Killian documents affair and after Peter Arnett's interview with the Iraqi press. This approach is presumed to have been employed in the case of Dan Rather over a story that he ran on 60 Minutes in the month prior to the 2004 election that attempted to impugn the military record of George W. Bush by relying on allegedly fake documents that were provided by Bill Burkett, a retired Lieutenant Colonel in the Texas Army National Guard.

Finally, some countries have laws enforcing balance in state-owned media. Since 1991, the CBC and Radio Canada, its French language counterpart, are governed by the Broadcasting Act. This act states, among other things:

...the programming provided by the Canadian broadcasting system should:
 (i) be varied and comprehensive, providing a balance of information, enlightenment and entertainment for men, women and children of all ages, interests and tastes,
(...)
 (iv) provide a reasonable opportunity for the public to be exposed to the expression of differing views on matters of public concern

Besides these manual approaches, several (semi-)automated approaches have been developed by social scientists and computer scientists. These approaches identify differences in news coverage, which potentially resulted from media bias, by analyzing the text and meta data, such as author and publishing date. For instance, NewsCube is a news aggregator that extracts phrases that describe a topic differently compared to another. Another approach, matrix-based news aggregation, spans a matrix over two dimensions, such as publisher countries (in which articles have been published) and mentioned countries (on which country an article reports). As a result, each cell contains articles that have been published in one country and that report on another country. Particularly in international news topics, such an approach helps to reveal differences in media coverage between the involved countries. Attempts have also been made to utilize machine-learning to analyze the bias of text. For example, person-oriented framing analysis attempts to identify frames, i.e., "perspectives", in news coverage on a topic by determining how each person mentioned in the topic's coverage is portrayed.

To detect bias in news articles automatically, effort has been done to collect and annotate datasets for machine-learning methods. Conducted by Karlsruhe Institute of Technology, a multidimensional dataset based on Crowdsourcing has been created for analyzing and detecting News Bias. This schema covers the overall bias, as well as the bias dimensions (1) hidden assumptions, (2) subjectivity, and (3) representation tendencies. The data set consists of more than 2,000 sentences annotated with 43,000 bias and bias dimension labels. The study shows that crowdworkers’ countries of origin seem to affect their judgements. Non-Western crowdworkers tend to annotate more bias either directly or in the form of bias dimensions (e.g., subjectivity) than Western crowdworkers do.

National and ethnic viewpoint 
Many news organizations reflect, or are perceived to reflect in some way, the viewpoint of the geographic, ethnic, and national population that they primarily serve. Media within countries are sometimes seen as being sycophantic or unquestioning about the country's government.

Western media are often criticized in the rest of the world (including eastern Europe, Asia, Africa, and the Middle East) as being pro-Western with regard to a variety of political, cultural and economic issues.  Al Jazeera is frequently criticized both in the West and in the Arab world.

The Israeli–Palestinian conflict and wider Arab–Israeli issues are a particularly controversial area, and nearly all coverage of any kind generates accusation of bias from one or both sides. This topic is covered in a separate article.

Anglophone bias in the world media 
It has been observed that the world's principal suppliers of news, the news agencies, and the main buyers of news are Anglophone corporations and this gives an Anglophone bias to the selection and depiction of events. Anglophone definitions of what constitutes news are paramount; the news provided originates in Anglophone capitals and responds first to their own rich domestic markets.

Despite the plethora of news services, most news printed and broadcast throughout the world each day comes from only a few major agencies, the three largest of which are the Associated Press, Reuters and Agence France-Presse.

Religious bias 
The media are often accused of bias favoring a particular religion or of bias against a particular religion.  In some countries, only reporting approved by a state religion is permitted, whereas in other countries, derogatory statements about any belief system are considered hate crimes and are illegal.

The Satanic panic, a moral panic and episode of national hysteria that emerged in the U.S. in the 1980s (and thereafter to Canada, Britain, and Australia), was reinforced by tabloid media and infotainment. Scholar Sarah Hughes, in a study published in 2016, argued that the panic "both reflected and shaped a cultural climate dominated by the overlapping worldviews of politically active conservatives" whose ideology "was incorporated into the panic and reinforced through" tabloid media, sensationalist television and magazine reporting, and local news. Although the panic dissipated in the 1990s after it was discredited by journalists and the courts, Hughes argues that the panic has had an enduring influence in American culture and politics even decades later.

In 2012, Huffington Post, columnist Jacques Berlinerblau argued that secularism has often been misinterpreted in the media as another word for atheism, stating that: "Secularism must be the most misunderstood and mangled ism in the American political lexicon. Commentators on the right and the left routinely equate it with Stalinism, Nazism and Socialism, among other dreaded isms.  In the United States, of late, another false equation has emerged. That would be the groundless association of secularism with atheism. The religious right has profitably promulgated this misconception at least since the 1970s."

According to Stuart A. Wright, there are six factors that contribute to media bias against minority religions: first, the knowledge and familiarity of journalists with the subject matter; second, the degree of cultural accommodation of the targeted religious group; third, limited economic resources available to journalists; fourth, time constraints; fifth, sources of information used by journalists; and finally, the front-end/back-end disproportionality of reporting. According to Yale Law professor Stephen Carter, "it has long been the American habit to be more suspicious ofand more repressive towardreligions that stand outside the mainline Protestant-Roman Catholic-Jewish troika that dominates America's spiritual life." As for front-end/back-end disproportionality, Wright says: "news stories on unpopular or marginal religions frequently are predicated on unsubstantiated allegations or government actions based on faulty or weak evidence occurring at the front-end of an event. As the charges weighed in against material evidence, these cases often disintegrate. Yet rarely is there equal space and attention in the mass media given to the resolution or outcome of the incident. If the accused are innocent, often the public is not made aware."

Social media bias 
Within the United States, Pew Research Center reported that 64% of Americans believed that social media had a toxic effect on U.S. society and culture in July 2020. Only 10% of Americans believed that it had a positive effect on society. Some of the main concerns with social media lie with the spread of deliberately false or misinterpreted information and the spread of hate and extremism. Social scientist experts explain the growth of misinformation and hate as a result of the increase in echo chambers.

Fueled by confirmation bias, online echo chambers allow users to be steeped within their own ideology. Because social media is tailored to your interests and your selected friends, it is an easy outlet for political echo chambers. Another Pew Research poll in 2019 showed that 28% of US adults "often" find their news through social media, and 55% of US adults get their news from social media either "often" or "sometimes". Additionally, more people are reported as going to social media for their news as the COVID-19 pandemic has restricted politicians to online campaigns and social media live streams. GCF Global encourages online users to avoid echo chambers by interacting with different people and perspectives along with avoiding the temptation of confirmation bias.

Media scholar Siva Vaidhyanathan, in his book Anti-Social Media: How Facebook Disconnects Us and Undermines Democracy (2018), argues that on social media networks, the most emotionally charged and polarizing topics usually predominate, and that "If you wanted to build a machine that would distribute propaganda to millions of people, distract them from important issues, energize hatred and bigotry, erode social trust, undermine journalism, foster doubts about science, and engage in massive surveillance all at once, you would make something a lot like Facebook."

In a 2021 report, researchers at the New York University's Stern Center for Business and Human Rights found that Republicans' frequent argument that social media companies like Facebook and Twitter have an "anti-conservative" bias is false and lacks any reliable evidence supporting it; the report found that right-wing voices are in fact dominant on social media, and that the claim that these platforms have an anti-conservative lean "is itself a form of disinformation."

A 2021 study in Nature Communications examined political bias on social media by assessing the degree to which Twitter users were exposed to content on the left and rightspecifically, exposure on the home timeline (the "news feed"). The study found that conservative Twitter accounts are exposed toward content on the right, whereas liberal accounts are exposed to moderate content, shifting those users' experiences toward the political center. The study determined: "Both in terms of information to which they are exposed and content they produce, drifters initialized with Right-leaning sources stay on the conservative side of the political spectrum. Those initialized with Left-leaning sources, on the other hand, tend to drift toward the political center: they are exposed to more conservative content and even start spreading it." These findings held true for both hashtags and links. The study also found that conservative accounts are exposed to substantially more low-credibility content than other accounts.

A 2022 study in PNAS, using a long-running massive-scale randomized experiment, found that the political right enjoys higher algorithmic amplification than the political left in six out of seven countries studied. In the US, algorithmic amplification favored right-leaning news sources.

Conservatives have argued that Facebook and Twitter limiting the spread of the Hunter Biden laptop controversy on their platforms that later turned out to be accurate "proves Big Tech's bias".

Media bias in social media is also reflected in hostile media effect. Social media has a place in disseminating news in modern society, where viewers are exposed to other people's comments while reading news articles. In their 2020 study, Gearhart and her team showed that viewers' perceptions of bias increased and perceptions of credibility decreased after seeing comments with which they held different opinions.

Media bias is also reflected in search systems in social media. Kulshrestha and her team found through research in 2018 that the top-ranked results returned by these search engines can influence users' perceptions when they conduct searches for events or people, which is particularly reflected in political bias and polarizing topics.

Anti-union and anti-worker bias 
In 1979, a phone survey of 60 trade unions in Brisbane, Queensland, Australia found that nearly 80% of all unions and nearly 90% of all blue collar unions believe that they are not covered fairly by the media. 53.7% of unions believe that the main cause of bias is the media's editorial process. 55% of unions do not use the media.

In 1993, political scientist Michael Parenti "catalogued seven generalizations about the way the news media create anti-union messaging – from painting workers as greedy, to omitting the salary of management, or depicting public officials as neutral."

According to a 2015 study in Teaching Media Quarterly, "Research has shown that workers, and unionized workers in particular, are almost always portrayed in a negative light by the mainstream media."

Role of language 
Bias is often reflected in which language is used, and in the way that language is used. Mass media has a worldwide reach, but must communicate with each linguistic group in some language they understand. The use of language may be neutral, or may attempt to be as neutral as possible, using careful translation and avoiding culturally charged words and phrases. Or it may be intentionally or accidentally biased, using mistranslations and trigger words targeting particular groups.

For example, in Bosnia and Herzegovina there are three mutually intelligible languages, Bosnian, Croatian, and Serbian. Media that try to reach as large an audience as possible use words common to all three languages. Media that want to target just one group may choose words that are unique to that group. In the United States, while most media is in English, in the 2020 election both major political parties used Spanish language advertising to reach out to Hispanic voters. Al Jazeera originally used Arabic, to reach its target audience, but in 2003 launched Al Jazeera English to broaden that audience.

Attempts to use language designed to appeal to a particular cultural group can backfire, as when Kimberly Guilfoyle, speaking at the Republican National Convention in 2020, said she was proud that her mother was an immigrant from Puerto Rico. Puerto Ricans were quick to point out that they are born American citizens, and are not immigrants.

There are also false flag broadcasts, that pretend to be favoring one group, while using language deliberately chosen to anger the target audience.

Language may also introduce a more subtle form of bias. The selection of metaphors and analogies, or the inclusion of personal information in one situation but not another can introduce bias, such as a gender bias.  Use of a word with positive or negative connotations rather than a more neutral synonym can form a biased picture in the audience's mind. For example, it makes a difference whether the media calls a group "terrorists" or "freedom fighters" or "insurgents". A 2005 memo to the staff of the CBC states:
Rather than calling assailants "terrorists," we can refer to them as bombers, hijackers, gunmen (if we're sure no women were in the group), militants, extremists, attackers or some other appropriate noun.

In a widely criticized episode, initial online BBC reports of the 7 July 2005 London bombings identified the perpetrators as terrorists, in contradiction to the BBC's internal policy. But by the next day, journalist Tom Gross noted that the online articles had been edited, replacing "terrorists" by "bombers". In another case, March 28, 2007, the BBC paid almost $400,000 in legal fees in a London court to keep an internal memo dealing with alleged anti-Israeli bias from becoming public. The BBC has been accused of having a pro-Israel bias.

See also 

 
 
 
 
 
 
 
 
 
 
 
 
 
 
 
 
 
 
 
 
 
 Sensationalism

References

Further reading

External links 
 
 
 
 
 

 
Books about media bias
Influence of mass media
Mass media issues
Social influence
Criticism of journalism
Censorship
Publishing